Aberdeen F.C. competed in the Scottish Premier Division, Scottish League Cup, Scottish Cup and European Cup Winners' Cup in season 1990–91.

Overview

The 1990–91 season finished on a low note for Aberdeen, as they led the championship going into the final day of the season but lost to Rangers, which gave the opposition the league title. Aberdeen's defence of the Scottish Cup ended at the first hurdle when eventual winners Motherwell defeated them at Pittodrie in January 1991. In the League Cup, Aberdeen lost to Rangers in the semi final, while in the European Cup Winners' Cup, they lost at the second round stage to Polish club Legia Warsaw. Hans Gillhaus and Eoin Jess finished as joint top scorers with 15 goals each.

Results

Scottish Premier Division

Final standings

Scottish League Cup

Scottish Cup

European Cup Winners' Cup

Squad

Appearances & Goals

|}

References

 AFC Heritage Trust
 

Aberdeen F.C. seasons
Aberdeen